Ignazio Masotti (16 January 1817 – 31 October 1888) was an Italian cardinal.

References

1817 births
1888 deaths
19th-century Italian cardinals
Cardinals created by Pope Leo XIII